Shamini Kumaresan (born 1988) is a professional table tennis player from Tamil Nadu, India. She did her schooling from Atomic Energy Central School Kalpakkam and Adarsh Vidyalaya, Chennai. She led the women's team which won the silver in the 19th Commonwealth table tennis championship held at Delhi in 2010. She is currently playing in the Bundesliga of Germany for the club TuS Bad Driburg.

See also 
 Poulomi Ghatak
 Mouma Das

References 

1988 births
Living people
Indian female table tennis players
Racket sportspeople from Chennai
Commonwealth Games silver medallists for India
Table tennis players at the 2010 Commonwealth Games
Table tennis players at the 2010 Asian Games
Table tennis players at the 2006 Asian Games
Commonwealth Games medallists in table tennis
Sportswomen from Tamil Nadu
21st-century Indian women
21st-century Indian people
Asian Games competitors for India
Tamil sportspeople
Medallists at the 2010 Commonwealth Games
South Asian Games gold medalists for India
South Asian Games silver medalists for India
South Asian Games medalists in table tennis